Dugan Aguilar (1947–2018) was a Native American photographer whose work has been exhibited by major museums. He is "among the first Native photographers to document Native life in Yosemite and California through his own vision."

Early life
Robert Dugan Aguilar was born on August 8, 1947, in Susanville, California, where he grew up. His mother's family was Maidu from the Green River Rancheria and Achomawi living on Hat Creek. His father was Northern Paiute from the Walker River Indian Reservation in Nevada. Aguilar also has some Irish ancestry and preferred the name Dugan, because it means "of dark complexion" in Gaelic.

Military service 
Leonard Lowry, one of the most decorated Native American war heroes of the U.S. military, was Aguilar's uncle. Lowry joined the United States Army in 1940, served in Australia, New Guinea, the Philippines, and Japan during and after World War II. Lowry won the Distinguished Service Cross in Korea in 1950, and retired after 27 years as a lieutenant colonel.

Aguilar served in the Vietnam War for 13 months. The Maidu community made him a warrior when he returned and gave him a beaded golden eagle feather award. His mother transformed his uniform into a quilt.

Education 
Aguilar graduated from California State University, Fresno in 1973. He studied photography at the graduate level at University of California, Santa Cruz; University of California, Davis; and University of Nevada, Reno.

Art career 
Ansel Adams was an influence and inspiration to Aguilar. After Aguilar first saw photos by Adams at the Palace of the Legion of Honor in San Francisco in 1973, he decided to learn how to print negatives in a similar way. He took a workshop with Ansel Adams in 1978, and decided to concentrate his career on documenting the Native Americans of California and Nevada.  He has used techniques advocated by Adams such as previsualization and use of red filters to create a dark sky.

According to independent curator and scholar Brian Bibby, "Aguilar's work is informed by familiarity and affiliation with his subject."

Death 
Dugan Aguilar died on October 6, 2018, in Elk Grove, California.

Exhibitions
 Ansel Adams Center for Photography, "Constructing Histories: Portraits of Native Americans", 1998
 Crocker Art Museum, 2001
 Maidu Interpretive Center, Roseville, California, "Honoring Hudessi, 2001
 Autry National Center, "Picturing the People", 2007–2008
 Grace Hudson Museum, 2008
 Oakland Museum of California, 2010
 de Saisset Museum, Santa Clara University, 2010

Books
Dugan Aguilar's photographs have been published in the following books:
 Deeper Than Gold: A Guide to Indian Life in the Sierra Foothills, Heyday Books
 Weaving A California Tradition: A Native American Basketmaker
 The Dirt Is Red Here: Art and Poetry From Native California
 Yosemite: Art of an American Icon
 Remember Your Relations: The Elsie Allen Baskets, Family & Friends
 The Fine Art of California Indian Basketry
 American Indians and the Urban Experience
 Seaweed, Salmon, and Manzanita Cider: a California Indian Feast
 Grass Games & Moon Races: California Indian Games and Toys
 The Green Book of Language Revitalization in Practice
 Precious Cargo: California Indian Cradle Baskets and Childbirth Traditions
 Memory and Imagination: the Legacy of Maidu Indian Artist Frank Day
 She Sang Me A Good Luck Song: The California Indian Photographs of Dugan Aguilar

References

External links
 The Autry National Center - Dugan Aguilar discusses photographing the Tuolumne Rancheria Roundhouse
 Alliance for California Traditional Arts: Basket by Eva Salazar (Photo: Dugan Aguilar)

1947 births
2018 deaths
Native American photographers
Maidu people
Northern Paiute people
People from Susanville, California
20th-century Native Americans
21st-century Native Americans